Tullycarnan (Ardglass) is a townland of 154 acres in County Down, Northern Ireland. It is situated in the civil parish of Ardglass and the historic barony of Lecale Lower.

There is a townland of the same name in the civil parish of Witter and historic barony of Ards Upper.

References

Townlands of County Down
Civil parish of Ardglass